This is a list of exoplanet discoveries that were the first by several criteria, including:

 the detection method used,
 the planet type,
 the planetary system type,
 the star type,
and others.

The first
The choice of "first" depends on definition and confirmation, as below. The three systems detected prior to 1994 each have a drawback, with Gamma Cephei b being unconfirmed until 2002; while the PSR B1257+12 planets orbit a pulsar. This leaves 51 Pegasi b (discovered and confirmed 1995) as the first confirmed exoplanet around a normal star.

By discovery method

By detection method

By system type

By star type

By planet type

Other

See also
 Lists of exoplanets
 List of exoplanet extremes
 Most earth-like exoplanets

Notes

References

Planetary firsts
Extrasolar planet firsts
Extrasolar planets
Extrasolar planet firsts
Firsts